The Australian women's cricket team toured England in 2013. The visitors were defending the Women's Ashes.

The only Test match of the tour took place on 11–14 August at Wormsley Park, and was drawn. Three One-Day Internationals (ODIs) were played: the first at Lord's on 20 August, and the other two at Hove on 23 and 25 August. Also three Twenty20 International (T20I) matches were played, on 27, 29 and 31 August, at Chelmsford, Southampton and Chester-le-Street respectively (the second and third of these being followed, on the same dates and at the same venues, by T20I matches in the concurrent Australian men's tour).

The tourists also played a match against the England Academy women on 5–6 August at Brunton Memorial Ground, Radlett. Australia won the match by 116 runs.

In 2013, for the first time, the Ashes were decided based on a points system, taking account not only of the one Test match, but also the results of limited-overs games. Six points were awarded for a Test victory (two points to each side in the event of a draw), and two points for a victory in any of the ODIs and T20I games.

In that series England regained the Ashes as a result of its victory in the second T20I match. The final points total was England 12, Australia 4.

Squads

*Natalie Sciver replaced Georgia Elwiss (withdrew due to a back problem).

Warm-up matches
Australia played two warm-up matches against the England Women's Academy, the first was a two-day match on 5–6 August (prior to the Test match) and the second was an ODI on 17 August (prior to the ODI and T20I series).

Test

Test Match

ODI series

1st ODI

2nd ODI

3rd ODI

T20I series

1st T20I

2nd T20I

3rd T20I

Results

Statistics

Batting
Most runs

Bowling
Most wickets

References

External links
Series home at ESPN Cricinfo
BBC Sport: schedule and results
BBC Sport: points system
BBC Sport: Test match report

2013 in women's cricket
2013–14 Australian women's cricket season
2013 in English women's cricket
England 2013
Australia 2013
August 2013 sports events in the United Kingdom
2013